Indiewood (also known as "speciality", "alternative", "indie" or "quality") films are those made outside of the Hollywood studio system or traditional arthouse/ independent filmmaking yet managed to be produced, financed and distributed by the two with varying degrees of success and/or failure.

Background 
Throughout the middle of the 1990s the word 'Indiewood' (aka "indie boom" or "indie film movement") was invented to describe a component of the spectrum of American films in which distinctions exist, it seemed as if Hollywood and the independent sector had become blurred. The American independent film, prior to the 1980s, was previously associated with b movies, blaxploitation films, avant-garde underground cinema (when it was known as the New American Cinema) and social realist dramas.

Indiewood divisions gain from expert experience of the niche industry by hiring leading independent personalities such as Harvey Weinstein from the Disney fold after the exit of the Weinsteins, and James Schamus, former joint head of Good Machine, at Focus Features.

Other "mini-major" subdivisions included Searchlight Pictures, Fine Line Features (established by New Line Cinema), Lionsgate, NEON, A24, Paramount Vantage, Summit Entertainment, Orion Pictures, Samuel Goldwyn Company, Warner Independent, United Artists (first founded in 1919 as an independent studio that allowed more creative freedom for former silent film stars like Mary Pickford and Charles Chaplin), Blumhouse and Sony Pictures Classics.

Differences from Hollywood

The films are often made for far less money than Hollywood films, and each aspect of the filmmaking process has to undergo less scrutiny by committees. Additionally, within the Indiewood approach the filmmaker can take as long as they need in the post-production phase of their film - whereas in Hollywood they are contracted to finish the film in a specific period of time (usually 10 weeks). In Hollywood, the film then goes on to show in focus group screenings on the studio lot.  In Indiewood, the filmmakers can determine the next steps of the film. They also bear striking similarities to as well as were influenced by the "proto-indies" of the 1960s such as Robert Downey Sr's still image film Chafed Elbows (1966),  John Cassavetes's Academy Award-nominated Faces and Brian de Palma's Greetings (each from 1968) which in turn were influenced by the culture of The Beat Generation, the polar opposite to the conformist, gray-flannel conformity of 1950s America.

Most Indiewood films are first shown at film festivals with the hopes of further distribution by being picked up (or purchased) by a larger film company or distributor alongside awards consideration (e.g. 2009's A Single Man).

List of selected Indiewood/Indie filmmakers

Julie Dash
Cheryl Dunye
Kathleen Collins
Lizzie Borden
Ava DuVernay
Dee Rees
Chloe Zhao
Lulu Wang
Mira Nair
Barry Jenkins
Jordan Peele
Billy Woodberry
Marlon Riggs
Stanley Nelson
Charles Burnett
William Greaves
Wendell B. Harris Jr.
Ryan Coogler
Tyler Perry
Spike Lee
Reginald Hudlin
John Singleton
Robert Townsend
Walter Salles
Ramin Bahrani
Alfonso Cuaron
Denzel Washington
Ang Lee
Wong Kar-wai
Lee Daniels
Daniels
Wayne Wang
Lee Isaac Chung
Park Chan-wook
Bong Joon Ho
Stephen Chow
Zhang Yimou
Lisa Cholodenko
Mario Van Peebles
Robert Rodriguez
Gregory Nava
Robert M. Young
Miguel Arteta
Guillermo del Toro
Pedro Almodovar
Satoshi Kon
Chris Eyre
Taika Waititi
Claudia Weill
Joyce Chopra
Mary Harron
Jennie Livingston
Penelope Spheeris
Martha Coolidge
Kelly Reichardt
Debra Granik
Susan Seidelman
Adrienne Shelly
Marjane Satrapi
Michaela Pavlátová
Masaaki Yuasa
John and Faith Hubley
Ralph Bakshi
Don Bluth
Richard Williams
Tomm Moore
Sylvain Chomet
Sergio Pablos
Don Hertzfeldt
Joanna Quinn
Candy Kugel
Evelyn Lambart
Caroline Leaf
Cordell Barker
Theodore Ushev
Konstantin Bronzit
Bill Plympton
Barry Purves
Joanna Priestley
PES
Suzan Pitt
Nina Paley
Adam Elliot
Nicole Holofcener
Tom McCarthy
Alex Garland
Patty Jenkins
Sarah Polley
Sian Heder
Lena Dunham
Greta Gerwig
Miranda July
Bette Gordon
Nancy Savoca
Todd Haynes
Luca Guadagnino
John Waters
Greg Araki
Sean Baker
Lodge Kerrigan
David Gordon Green
Alex Ross Perry
Jeff Nichols
Les Blank
Henry Jaglom
Jim McBride
Jonas Mekas
Mark Rappaport
Andrew Bujalski
John Cameron Mitchell
Gus Van Sant
Steve James
Wim Wenders
Jim McKay
Bo Burnham
Joel and Ethan Coen
Mark and Jay Duplass
Sam Raimi
Josh and Benny Safdie
Joe Swanberg
Rian Johnson
Christopher Guest
Alan Rudolph
James Gray
Andrea Arnold
Robert Eggers
Alex Cox
George A. Romero
Wes Craven
John Carpenter
Yorgos Lanthimos
Ari Aster
Paul Schrader
Alex Kendrick
Mike Mills
Joe Wright
John Carney
Jim Jarmusch

Zach Braff
George Clooney
James Mangold
Sam Mendes
Spike Jonze
Errol Morris
Kevin Macdonald
Atom Egoyan
Peter Jackson
Garth Jennings
Martin Scorsese
John Cassavetes
Brian de Palma
Robert Downey Sr
Norman Mailer
Andy Warhol
Curtis Harrington
Eric Rohmer
Ron Rice
Robert Frank
Kent Mackenzie
Neil Jordan
Bill Forsyth
Bob Clark
James Marsh
Greg Mottola
Jon Favreau
Bennett Miller
Jonathan Caouette
Larry Clark
Abel Ferrara
Michel Gondry
Wes Anderson
Noah Baumbach
Sofia Coppola
Kathryn Bigelow
Allison Anders
Barbara Kopple
Shirley Clarke
Barbara Loden
Roger Corman
Ray Dennis Steckler
John Sayles
Tom DiCillo
Carson Davidson
Doug Liman
Darren Aronofsky
Jason Reitman
Godfrey Reggio
Alexander Payne
Kimberly Peirce
David O. Russell
Kevin Smith
Roberto Benigni
David Mamet
Quentin Tarantino

Tim Burton
Neil LaBute
Todd Solondz
Danny Boyle
Terry Zwigoff
David Cronenberg
Christopher Nolan
Whit Stillman
Todd Field
Richard Kelly
Jean-Pierre Jeunet
Julian Schnabel
Jared Hess
Charlie Kaufman
Hal Hartley
David Lynch
David Fincher
Steven Soderbergh

Rob Reiner
Oliver Stone
Jonathan Glazer
Shane Carruth
Anthony Minghella
Peter Greenaway
Ken Loach
Michael Haneke
Denis Villeneuve
Harmony Korine
Richard Linklater
Robert Altman
William Friedkin
James Cameron
Damien Chazelle
Tom Ford
Michael Moore
Mel Gibson
Paul Thomas Anderson
Vincent Gallo
Paul Haggis
Bryan Singer
Lars von Trier
James Toback
Woody Allen

List of selected notable and important Indiewood/Indie films

Pre-1950s
Within Our Gates (1920)≈
The Scar of Shame (1927)
City Lights (1931)≈
As the Earth Turns (1938) 
The Great Dictator (1940)≈
Rebecca (1940)≈
The Blood of Jesus (1941)≈
Detour (1945)≈

1950s
Little Fugitive (1953)≈
3rd Ave. El (1955)
The Adventures of an * (1957)
Attack of the Crab Monsters (1957)
On the Bowery (1957)≈
12 Angry Men (1957)≈
The Blob (1958)
The Screaming Skull (1958)
Attack of the Giant Leeches (1959)
Moonbird (1959)
Plan 9 from Outer Space (1959)
Pull My Daisy (1959)≈
Shadows (1959)≈
Some Like It Hot (1959)≈
The Violinist (1959)

1960s
The Flower Thief (1960)
Munro (1960)
Psycho (1960)≈
Blast of Silence (1961)
The Connection (1961)
The Exiles (1961)≈
Night Tide (1961)
Something Wild (1961)
Surogat (1961)
Carnival of Souls (1962)
The Hole (1962)≈
Beach Party (1963)
Blood Feast (1963)
The Cool World (1963)≈
The Incredibly Strange Creatures Who Stopped Living and Became Mixed-Up Zombies (1963)
The Brig (1964)
Help! My Snowman's Burning Down (1964)
Nothing But a Man (1964)≈
Scorpio Rising (1964)≈
Time Piece (1965)
Vinyl (1965)
Chafed Elbows (1966)
A Herb Alpert and the Tijuana Brass Double Feature (1966)
The Wild Angels (1966)
David Holzman's Diary (1967)≈
Portrait of Jason (1967)≈
Spider Baby (1967)
The Trip (1967)
Who's That Knocking at My Door? (1967)
Beyond the Law (1968)
Faces (1968)≈
Greetings (1968)
Murder a la Mod (1968)
Night of the Living Dead (1968)≈
No More Excuses (1968)
Symbiopsychotaxiplasm Take One (1968)≈
Wild 90 (1968)
Easy Rider (1969)≈
Midnight Cowboy (1969)≈
My Night with Maud (1969)
Putney Swope (1969)≈

1970s
The Further Adventures of Uncle Sam (1970)
Husbands (1970)
Is It Always Right to Be Right? (1970)
Maidstone (1970)
Sweet Sweetback's Baadasssss Song (1970)≈
Wanda (1970)≈
Let's Scare Jessica to Death (1971)
McCabe and Mrs. Miller (1971)≈
Mon oncle Antoine (1971)
Shinbone Alley (1971)
THX-1138 (1971)
Two-Lane Blacktop (1971)≈
Fritz the Cat (1972)
The Last House on the Left (1972)
Pink Flamingos (1972)≈
Badlands (1973)≈
Coffy (1973)
Fantastic Planet (1973)
Ganja and Hess (1973)
Heavy Traffic (1973)
Mean Streets (1973)≈
Messiah of Evil (1973)
Sisters (1973)
Benji (1974)
Black Christmas (1974)
Dark Star (1974)
Female Trouble (1974)
The Texas Chainsaw Massacre (1974)
A Woman Under the Influence (1974)≈
Coney (1975)
Hester Street (1975)≈
The Rocky Horror Picture Show (1975)≈
Shivers (1975)
Harlan County U.S.A. (1976)≈
Alambrista! (1977)
Annie Hall (1977)≈
Eraserhead (1977)≈
The Hills Have Eyes (1977)
Killer of Sheep (1977)≈
Opening Night (1977)
Dawn of the Dead (1978)
Girlfriends (1978)≈
Halloween (1978)≈
Martin (1978)
Northern Lights (1978)
Piranha (1978)
Rockers (1978)
The Whole Shootin' Match (1978)
Asparagus (1979)
Bush Mama (1979)
Heartland (1979)
Mad Max (1979)

1980s
Friday the 13th (1980)
The Life and Times of Rosie the Riveter (1980)≈
Personal Problems (1980)
Return of the Secaucus 7 (1980)≈
The Decline of Western Civilization (1981)≈
The Evil Dead (1981)
Ms. 45 (1981)
My Dinner with Andre (1981)
Polyester (1981)
Will (1981)
Zoot Suit (1981)≈
The Atomic Cafe (1982)≈
The Ballad of Gregorio Cortez (1982)≈
Chan Is Missing (1982)≈
First Blood (1982)
Illusions (1982)≈
Liquid Sky (1982)
Losing Ground (1982)≈
The Loveless (1982)
Say Amen, Somebody (1982)
The Secret of NIMH (1982)
Smithereens (1982)
Born In Flames (1983)
El Norte (1983)≈
Koyaanisqatsi (1983)≈
Lianna (1983)
Local Hero (1983) 
My Brother's Wedding (1983)
Seventeen (1983)
Style Wars (1983)
Sundae in New York (1983)
Variety (1983)
Bless Their Little Hearts (1984)≈
The Brother from Another Planet (1984)
Choose Me (1984)
Comfort and Joy (1984)
The Element of Crime (1984)
In Heaven There Is No Beer? (1984)
Love Streams (1984)
A Nightmare on Elm Street (1984)≈
Paris, Texas (1984)
Repo Man (1984)
Stranger Than Paradise (1984)

≈
Streetwise (1984)
The Terminator (1984)≈
This Is Spinal Tap (1984)≈
The Times of Harvey Milk (1984)≈
Wildrose (1984)
Blood Simple (1985)

Day of the Dead (1985)
Desert Hearts (1985)
Desperately Seeking Susan (1985)
Down By Law (1986)
Kiss of the Spider Woman (1985)
Mala Noche (1985)
Smooth Talk (1985)
Teen Wolf (1985)
Trip to Bountiful (1985)
Betty Blue (1986)
Blue Velvet (1986)
The Cosmic Eye (1986)
Hannah and Her Sisters (1986)
Henry: Portrait of a Serial Killer (1986)
Hoosiers (1986)≈
Platoon (1986)≈
Parting Glances (1986)
A Room with a View (1986)
Salvador (1986)
She's Gotta Have It (1986)≈
Sherman's March (1986)≈
Sid and Nancy (1986)
Something Wild (1986)
Stand By Me (1986)
Swimming to Cambodia (1986)
True Stories (1986)
Working Girls (1986)
Bad Taste (1987)
The Big Easy (1987)
Border Radio (1987)
The Brave Little Toaster (1987)
Dirty Dancing (1987)
Hollywood Shuffle (1987)
House of Games (1987)
Matewan (1987)
Miami Connection (1987)
Near Dark (1987)
Pelle the Conqueror (1987)
Raising Arizona (1987)
River's Edge (1987)
Your Face (1987)
The Decline of Western Civilization Part II: The Metal Years (1988)
Grave of the Fireflies (1988)
Hairspray (1988)≈
Heat and Sunlight (1988)
Lady in White (1988)
Let's Get Lost (1988)
The Moderns (1988)
Powaqqatsi (1988)
Salaam Bombay (1988)
Stand and Deliver (1988)≈
The Thin Blue Line (1988)≈
Torch Song Trilogy (1988)
Who Killed Vincent Chin (1988)≈
All Dogs Go to Heaven (1989)
Chameleon Street (1989)
Cinema Paradiso (1989)
Common Threads: Stories from the Quilt (1989)
The Cook, the Thief, His Wife and Her Lover (1989)
Do the Right Thing (1989)≈
Drugstore Cowboy (1989)
Heathers (1989)
Henry V (1989)
Longtime Companion (1989)
My Left Foot (1989)
Mystery Train (1989)
Roger & Me (1989)≈
sex, lies and videotape (1989)

≈
Sidewalk Stories (1989)
Sweetie (1989)
True Love (1989)
The Unbelievable Truth (1989)

1990s
All My Relations (1990)
Days of Being Wild (1990)
The Grifters (1990)
House Party (1990)≈
Jacob's Ladder (1990)
Metropolitan (1990)
Miller's Crossing (1990)
Mountains of the Moon (1990)
Paris Is Burning (1990)≈
Sink or Swim (1990)≈
Teenage Mutant Ninja Turtles (1990)
Tie Me Up! Tie Me Down! (1990)
To Sleep with Anger (1990)≈
Total Recall (1990)
Trust (1990)
Wild at Heart (1990)
Barton Fink (1991)
Daughters of the Dust (1991)≈
Dogfight (1991)
Europa (1991)
Fast Food Matador (1991)
Homicide (1991)
L.A. Story (1991)
Truth or Dare (1991)
Mississippi Masala (1991)
My Own Private Idaho (1991)
Night on Earth (1991)
Poison (1991)
Rambling Rose (1991)
The Rapture (1991)
Rock-A-Doodle (1991)
Slacker (1991)≈
Straight Out of Brooklyn (1991)
Terminator 2: Judgment Day (1991)
American Me (1992)
Bad Lieutenant (1992)
Basic Instinct (1992)
Bob Roberts (1992)
A Brief History of Time (1992)
The Crying Game (1992)
Ferngully: The Last Rainforest (1992)
Gas Food Lodging (1992)
Glengarry Glen Ross (1992)
In the Soup (1992)
The Living End (1992)
Passion Fish (1992)
The Player (1992)
Reservoir Dogs (1992)
Simple Men (1992)
Strictly Ballroom (1992)
Swoon (1992)
The Tune (1992)
Twin Peaks: Fire Walk with Me (1992)
Dazed and Confused (1993)
El Mariachi (1993)≈
Like Water for Chocolate (1993)
Menace II Society (1993)
Mi Vida Loca (1993)
Red Rock West (1993)
Ruby in Paradise (1993)
Short Cuts (1993)
Suture (1993)
The Wedding Banquet (1993)
Clean, Shaven (1994)
Clerks (1994)

≈
Exotica (1994)
Four Weddings and a Funeral (1994)
Fresh (1994)
Go Fish (1994)
Heavenly Creatures (1994)
Hoop Dreams (1994)≈
The Hudsucker Proxy (1994)
I Like It Like That (1994) 
The Last Seduction (1994)
Little Odessa (1994)
Mrs. Parker and the Vicious Circle (1994)
Pulp Fiction (1994)

≈
Reality Bites (1994)
River of Grass (1994)
Serial Mom (1994)
Shallow Grave (1994) 
Spanking the Monkey (1994)
Thumbelina (1994)
What Happened Was... (1994)
Before Sunrise (1995)
The Brothers McMullen (1995)
Crumb (1995)
Dead Man (1995)
Dead Man Walking (1995)
Friday (1995)
Kicking and Screaming (1995)
Kids (1995)
La Haine (1995)
Leaving Las Vegas (1995)
Living in Oblivion (1995)
The Pebble and the Penguin (1995)
Safe (1995)
Se7en (1995)
Smoke (1995)
The Usual Suspects (1995)
Basquiat (1996)
Big Night (1996)
Bottle Rocket (1996)
Box of Moonlight (1996)
Breaking the Waves (1996)
Citizen Ruth (1996)
The Daytrippers (1996)
The English Patient (1996)
Fargo (1996)≈
Flirting with Disaster (1996)

Hard Eight (1996)
I Shot Andy Warhol (1996)
Lone Star (1996)
Mystery Science Theater 3000: The Movie (1996)
Schizopolis (1996)
Secrets & Lies (1996)
Shine (1996)
Sling Blade (1996)
The Spitfire Grill (1996)
Swingers (1996)
Trainspotting (1996)
Trees Lounge (1996)
Waiting for Guffman (1996)
Walking and Talking (1996)
The Watermelon Woman (1996)≈
Welcome to the Dollhouse (1996)
 When We Were Kings (1996)
 The Apostle (1997)
 Chasing Amy (1997)
 Cop Land (1997)
 Eve's Bayou (1997)≈
 The Full Monty (1997)
 Good Will Hunting (1997)
Grosse Pointe Blank (1997)
Gummo (1997)
Henry Fool (1997)
I Married a Strange Person (1997)
In the Company of Men (1997)
Jackie Brown (1997)
Lost Highway (1997)
Love Jones (1997)
The Sweet Hereafter (1997)
Ulee's Gold (1997)
The Big Lebowski (1998)≈
Boogie Nights (1998)
Buffalo 66 (1998)
Following (1998)
 Gods and Monsters (1998)
Happiness (1998)
Happy Together (1998)
High Art (1998)
Life is Beautiful (1998)
Lock, Stock and Two Smoking Barrels (1998)
New Rose Hotel (1998)
The Opposite of Sex (1998)
Next Stop Wonderland (1998)
Pi (1998)
Rushmore (1998)≈
Run Lola Run (1998)
Shakespeare in Love (1998)
Slam (1998)
Smoke Signals (1998)≈
The Spanish Prisoner (1998)
Velvet Goldmine (1998)
American Beauty (1999)
American Movie (1999)
Being John Malkovich (1999)
The Blair Witch Project (1999)

Boys Don't Cry (1999)≈
Buena Vista Social Club (1999)≈
Cruel Intentions (1999)
Dogma (1999)
Election (1999)
Fight Club (1999)
Ghost Dog: Way of the Samurai (1999)
Julien Donkey-Boy (1999)
Magnolia (1999)
The Sixth Sense (1999)
Star Wars: The Phantom Menace (1999)
The Straight Story (1999)
The Talented Mr. Ripley (1999)
Three Kings (1999)

2000s
Almost Famous (2000)±
American Psycho (2000)
Best in Show (2000)
Chuck & Buck (2000)
Crouching Tiger, Hidden Dragon (2000)±
Finding Forrester (2000)
George Washington (2000)
Girlfight (2000)
In the Mood for Love (2000)±
Memento (2000)≈±
Nurse Betty (2000)
O Brother, Where Art Thou (2000)
Rejected (2000)
Requiem for a Dream (2000)±
State and Main (2000)
Traffic (2000)
The Yards (2000)
You Can Count on Me (2000)
Amelie (2001)±
Donnie Darko (2001)
Ghost World (2001)
Gosford Park (2001)
Hedwig and the Angry Inch (2001)
In the Bedroom (2001)
The Lord of the Rings: The Fellowship of the Ring (2001)≈
The Man Who Wasn't There (2001)
Millennium Actress (2001)
Monsoon Wedding (2001)
Monster's Ball (2001)
Mulholland Drive (2001)±
The Royal Tenenbaums (2001)±
Sexy Beast (2001)
Waking Life (2001)
Y Tu Mama Tambien (2001)
Adaptation (2002)
Antwone Fisher (2002)
Bend It Like Beckham (2002)
Bowling for Columbine (2002)
Chicago (2002)
City of God (2002)±
Far from Heaven (2002)±
Funny Ha Ha (2002)
Gangs of New York (2002)
Gerry (2002)
Hero (2002)
Laurel Canyon (2002)
The Magdalene Sisters (2002)
My Big Fat Greek Wedding (2002)
Naqoyqatsi (2002)
Personal Velocity (2002)
The Pianist (2002)±
Punch-Drunk Love (2002)
Real Women Have Curves (2002)≈
Roger Dodger (2002)
Secretary (2002)
Solaris (2002)
Spellbound (2002)
25th Hour (2002)±
28 Days Later (2002)
Whale Rider (2002)
Winged Migration (2002)
American Splendor (2003)
Capturing the Friedmans (2003)
Coffee and Cigarettes (2003)
Cold Mountain (2003)
The Cooler (2003)
Elephant (2003)
The Fog of War (2003)≈
Girl with a Pearl Earring (2003)
Good Bye, Lenin! (2003)
Harvie Krumpet (2003)
In America (2003)
Kill Bill Volume 1 (2003)
Lost in Translation (2003)±
Monster (2003)
Open Water (2003)
The Room (2003)
The Saddest Music in the World (2003)
Shattered Glass (2003)
The Station Agent (2003)
Taranation (2003)
Thirteen (2003)
Touching the Void (2003)
The Triplets of Belleville (2003)
21 Grams (2003)
The Aviator (2004)
Baadasssss! (2004)
Before Sunset (2004)±
Eternal Sunshine of the Spotless Mind (2004)±
Fahrenheit 9/11 (2004)
Garden State (2004)
Keane (2004) 
Kung Fu Hustle (2004)
The Life Aquatic with Steve Zissou (2004)
Maria Full of Grace (2004)
Mean Creek (2004)
Mind Game (2004)
The Motorcycle Diaries (2004)
Napoleon Dynamite (2004)
Palindromes (2004)
The Passion of the Christ (2004)
Primer (2004)
Saw (2004)
Sideways (2004)
Silver City (2004)
Super Size Me (2004)
2046 (2004)
Take Out (2004)
A Very Long Engagement (2004)
We Don't Live Here Anymore (2004)
The Aristocrats (2005)
Brick (2005)
Brokeback Mountain (2005)≈±
Capote (2005)
Corpse Bride (2005)
Crash (2005)
Diary of a Mad Black Woman (2005)
Good Night and Good Luck (2005)
Hard Candy (2005)
Hoodwinked (2005)
Hostel (2005)
Hustle & Flow (2005)
Man Push Cart (2005)
March of the Penguins (2005)
Me and You and Everyone We Know (2005)
Mutual Appreciation (2005)
The Notorious Betty Page (2005)
Pride & Prejudice (2005)
The Puffy Chair (2005)
The Squid and the Whale (2005)
Syriana (2005)
The World's Fastest Indian (2005)
Babel (2006)
Barnyard (2006)
Bobby (2006)
Facing the Giants (2006)
For Your Consideration (2006)
Friends with Money (2006)
Half Nelson (2006)
An Inconvenient Truth (2006)
Iraq in Fragments (2006)
Inland Empire (2006)
Jonestown: The Life and Death of Peoples Temple (2006) 
Jesus Camp (2006)
Little Children (2006)
Little Miss Sunshine (2006)
The Lives of Others (2006)±
Marie Antoinette (2006)
Nacho Libre (2006)
The Namesake (2006)
Old Joy (2006)
The Painted Veil (2006)
Pan's Labyrinth (2006)±
Paprika (2006)
A Prairie Home Companion (2006)
The Queen (2006)
Quinceañera (2006)
A Scanner Darkly (2006)
Southland Tales (2006)
Thank You for Smoking (2006)
Volver (2006)
Atonement (2007)
Control (2007)
The Darjeeling Limited (2007)
The Diving Bell and the Butterfly (2007)±
Eagle vs. Shark (2007)
Eastern Promises (2007)
I'm Not There (2007)
In Bruges (2007)
In the Valley of Elah (2007)
Juno (2007)
Lars and the Real Girl (2007)
Le Vie en rose (2007)
Margot at the Wedding (2007)
A Mighty Heart (2007)
No Country for Old Men (2007)±
No End in Sight (2007)
Once (2007)
Paranormal Activity (2007)
Persepolis (2007)
The Savages (2007)
Sicko (2007)
Sunshine (2007)
There Will Be Blood (2007)±
Waitress (2007)
The Visitor (2007)
American Teen (2008)
Baghead (2008)
Be Kind Rewind (2008)
Fireproof (2008)
Frozen River (2008) 
Man on Wire (2008)
Medicine for Melancholy (2008)
Rachel Getting Married (2008)
Sita Sings the Blues (2008)
Slumdog Millionaire (2008)
Son of Rambow (2008)
Synecdoche, New York (2008)±
Twilight (2008)
Tyson (2008)
Wendy and Lucy (2008)
The Wrestler (2008)
Adventureland (2009)
Away We Go (2009)
Antichrist (2009)
Coraline (2009)
The Cove (2009)
Enter the Void (2009)
Fantastic Mr. Fox (2009)
500 Days of Summer (2009)
The Hurt Locker (2009)≈±
Inglourious Basterds (2009)±
Mary & Max (2009)
Moon (2009)
Precious (2009)
Revolutionry Road (2009)
The Secret of Kells (2009)
A Serious Man (2009)±
A Single Man (2009)
Sin Nombre (2009)
Trash Humpers (2009)
The White Ribbon (2009)±

2010s
Beginners (2010)
Beyond the Black Rainbow (2010)
Black Swan (2010)
Blue Valentine (2010)
Catfish (2010)
A Cat in Paris (2010)
Greenberg (2010)
Incendies (2010)The Illusionist (2010)Inside Job (2010)The Kids Are All Right (2010)The King's Speech (2010)Meek's Cutoff (2010)Winter's Bone (2010)Rural Crimewave - A Companion to American Indie Film - Wiley Online LibraryThe Artist (2011)Chico & Rita (2011)The Color Wheel (2011)Damsels in Distress (2011)The Descendants (2011)Drive (2011)The Future (2011)Martha Marcy May Marlene (2011)Pariah (2011)Pariah Wins Acceptance In Indie Film World - Wall Street Journal≈Project Nim (2011)Take Shelter (2011)Review: 'Take Shelter' A Naturalistic, Novelistic Portrayal Of Madness & Apocalypse|IndieWireThe Tree of Life (2011)±We Need to Talk About Kevin (2011)Young Adult (2011)Amour (2012)Beasts of the Southern Wild (2012)Frances Ha (2012)Fresh Guacamole (2012)Holy Motors (2012)±It's Such a Beautiful Day (2012)The Master (2012)±Middle of Nowhere (2012)'Middle of Nowhere' review: Quiet indie drama offers a look at a woman in limbo|Movies/TV|nola.comParanorman (2012)The Place Beyond the Pines (2012)Spring Breakers (2012)±Stories We Tell (2012)±Before Midnight (2013)Blue Is the Warmest Colour (2013)±Dallas Buyers Club (2013)Fruitvale Station (2013)Moonrise Kingdom (2013)±Nebraska (2013)Nymphomaniac (2013)Only God Forgives (2013)Philomena (2013)Short Term 12 (2013)12 Years a Slave (2013)±The Wolf of Wall Street (2013)±Birdman (2014)The Boxtrolls (2014)Boyhood (2014)±Ex Machina (2014)Foxcatcher (2014)Grand Budapest Hotel (2014)±The Imitation Game (2014)Listen Up Philip (2014)Nightcrawler (2014)Song of the Sea (2014)Still Alice (2014)The Theory of Everything (2014)Whiplash (2014)Anomalisa (2015)Beasts of No Nation (2015)Carol (2015)Dope (2015)It Follows (2015)The Lobster (2015)Me and Earl and the Dying Girl (2015)Prologue (2015)Shaun the Sheep Movie (2015)Spotlight (2015)±Tangerine (2015)We Can't Live Without Cosmos (2015)The VVitch (2015)World of Tomorrow (2015)The best indie animation of 2015|Sight & Sound|BFIAmerican Honey (2016)Blind Vaysha (2016)Fences (2016)The Handmaiden (2016)Hunt for the Wilderpeople (2016)I, Daniel Blake (2016)La La Land (2016)Manchester by the Sea (2016)Moonlight (2016)Academy Award nominations 2020: The return of the "quality" Hollywood studio film - News - University of LiverpoolThe best A24 films to date|EW.comMy Life as a Zucchini (2016)Paterson (2016)Swiss Army Man (2016)20th Century Women (2016)Weiner (2016)The Big Sick (2017)Call Me By Your Name (2017)The Disaster Artist (2017)First Reformed (2017)The Florida Project (2017)Get Out (2017)Good Time (2017)I, Tonya (2017)Indie Focus: Outsiders abound in 'The Shape of Water', 'I, Tonya', 'Foxtrot' and 'Bombshell' - Los Angeles TimesLady Bird (2017)Loving Vincent (2017)Phantom Thread (2017)The Shape of Water (2017)Eighth Grade (2018)The Favourite (2018)Hereditary (2018)Isle of Dogs (2018)The Last Black Man in San Francisco (2018)The Rider (2018)The Rider: Exclusive trailer for new western hailed best indie of the year|The IndependentWaves (2018)Whitney (2018)The Farewell (2019)First Cow (2019)I Lost My Body (2019)Oscars: Can Netflix's French Dark Horse 'I Lost My Body' Upset The Big Guns In The Animated Feature Race? – Exclusive Featurette - DeadlineJojo Rabbit (2019)Klaus (2019)The Lighthouse (2019)Pain and Glory (2019)Parasite (2019)The Peanut Butter Falcon (2019)Uncut Gems (2019)

2020sCryptozoo (2020)Indie Film: Fantastical creatures populate the what-if world of 'Cryptozoo' - Portland Press HeraldKajillionaire (2020)Minari (2020)Nomadland (2020)Indie Focus: On the road with Frances McDormand in ‘Nomadland’ - Los Angeles TimesWolfwalkers (2020)Annie Awards Indie Feature Noms Offer a Diversity of Themes and Styles|Animation World NetworkZola (2020)CODA (2021)Flee (2021)6 Indie And Foreign Animated Features Building Buzz For Oscars 2022|Cartoon BrewJockey (2021)How real-world magic graces the making of Clifton Collins Jr.’s ‘Jockey’ - Los Angeles TimesRed Rocket (2021)Summer of Soul (2021)Indie Prof: "The Rescue" and "Summer of Soul"|Front PorchEverything Everywhere All At Once (2022)A24's 'Everything Everywhere All at Once' Hits Box Office Milestone - VarietyIndie Film Crush, Ahead Of 'Avatar' & Year End, Puts Arthouse Woes On Back Burner – Specialty Preview  - DeadlineFire of Love (2022)Marcel the Shell with Shoes On (2022)'Marcel the Shell With Shoes On' Director Explains What It Took to Pull Off One of the Year's Most Charming Movies|The WrapA brief, and somewhat shocking, history of adult animation|The A.V. Club

Notes
≈ indicates a National Film Registry inductee
± indicates a film selected for the BBC's 100 Greatest Films of the 21st Century

 See also 
L.A. Rebellion
Peak TV
American Eccentric Cinema
New Hollywood
Postmodernist film
Oscar bait
Arthouse animation
Cinephilia
Sundance Film Festival
Minimalist and maximalist cinema
Vulgar auteurism
Sleeper hit
European art cinema
Independent Spirit Awards
Mumblecore
Arthouse action film
Slamdance Film Festival
Arthouse science fiction film
Arthouse musical
Independent animation
Midnight film

 References 

 External links 
 Indiewood Finally Figures Out That Their Movies Are Depressing on Vulture
 Indie, Inc. on Project MUSE
 10 Indies We Love Archives on Film Independent
 The 20 Best Indie Animation Features of the 2010s on Zippy Frames
 The Real Indies: A Close Look at Orphan Films at Oscars.org
 American Indies on MUBI
 BAM's Indie 80s trailer on Vimeo
 "The Edge of Hollywood" episode of American Cinema on Annenberg Learner
 Low-Budget, Independent Films, 1981 – Siskel and Ebert Movie Reviews

 Bibliography 
 Spike, Mike, Slackers, & Dykes: A Guided Tour Across a Decade of American Independent Cinema, John Pierson
 A Killer Life, Christine Vachon
 Down & Dirty Pictures, Peter Biskind
 Indie: An American Film Culture, Michael Z. Newman Ph.D
 American Independent Cinema'', Geoff King

Film genres particular to the United States
1920s in film
1930s in film
1940s in film
1950s in film
1960s in film
1970s in film
1980s in film
1990s in film
2000s in film
2010s in film
2020s in film
1920s in American cinema
1930s in American cinema
1940s in American cinema
1950s in American cinema
1960s in American cinema
1970s in American cinema
1980s in American cinema
1990s in American cinema
2000s in American cinema
2010s in American cinema
2020s in American cinema
1950s in animation
1960s in animation
1970s in animation
1980s in animation
1990s in animation
2000s in animation
2010s in animation
2020s in animation
Postmodern art
Documentary film styles
Modern art